Solas may refer to:

People
Solås, a Norwegian surname
 Daniel Solas (born 1946), French former footballer
 Humberto Solás (1941–2008), Cuban director
 María Ruiz Solás (born 1970), Spanish journalist, businesswoman, politician

Fictional characters
 Solas (Dragon Age), the name of an Elven Mage from Dragon Age: Inquisition

Places
 Sollas, Outer Hebrides, Scotland, UK; a village

Arts and entertainment
 Solas (group), an Irish-American musical group
 Solas (album), an album by The Answer
 Solas Festival, a Scottish music festival
 Solas (film), a 1999 Spanish film directed by Benito Zambrano

Other
 The Five Solas, Latin phrases summarizing the core beliefs behind the Protestant Reformation
 SOLAS Convention, the International Convention for the Safety of Life at Sea
 Surface Ocean Lower Atmosphere Study
 Service-Oriented Localisation Architecture Solution (SOLAS)
 SOLAS (Ireland) Irish state agency, in charge of further education and training, successor to FÁS.

See also

 
 
 
 A solas (disambiguation)
 Sola (disambiguation)